Buchanan is a locality in the City of Maitland and City of Cessnock, New South Wales, Australia.
It is approximately half farmland and half forested.  It  was notable as being the intersection of the roads between Maitland, Beresfield, Kurri and Edgeworth. It is the preferred location for a regional freight hub. In 2016, the population was 197, median age was 41 and 85% were born in Australia.

Roads 
The Hunter Expressway runs through Buchanan. There is a rest stop on the Expressway here, just to the south of the John Renshaw Drive interchange. The Hunter Expressway required four bridges to cross over Buchanan road; two for the through traffic, and one for the expressway's off-ramp southbound and on-ramp north bound.

Buchanan Road and George Booth Drive now meet at a new roundabout, which also intersects with John Renshaw Drive.

John Renshaw Drive crosses over the Hunter Expressway by the way of a circular bridge that forms an elevated roundabout and there are entrances and exits to the expressway in several directions.

References

Suburbs of Maitland, New South Wales
Suburbs of City of Cessnock